Jeanne, Dauphine d'Auvergne (1414-1436) was a reigning Dauphine of Auvergne in 1428-1434. She was the co-ruler of John I, Duke of Bourbon.

She was the daughter of Beraud III. She married Louis I, Count of Montpensier.

References

1414 births
1436 deaths
15th-century women rulers
Dauphins of Auvergne